Rainbow is a 2008 Indian Telugu-language film directed by V. N. Aditya and starring Rahul, Sonal Chauhan, and Sindhu Menon. The film released to negative reviews from critics.

Plot

Cast 

Rahul as Shyamal "Shyam" Rao
Sonal Chauhan as Swapna
Sindhu Menon as Kamala
Kiran vemmula
Gollapudi as Maruthi Rao
Paruchuri Venkateswara Rao as Srihari Rao
Prakash Raj as Shyam's doctor
S. S. Rajamouli as himself
Kodi Ramakrishna as himself
Srinu Vaitla as himself
V. Samudra as himself
Sangita Ghosh in a dance sequence

Soundtrack 
Songs by newcomer Nihal.

Themes and influences 
Jeevi of Idlebrain.com felt that the lead characters (Rahul being colourblind, Sindhu being mute, and Sonal being an actress) are similar to the characters of the 1986 film Sirivennela (Sarvadaman D. Banerjee is blind, Suhasini is mute, and Moon Moon Sen is glamorous).

Release 
Jeevi gave the film a rating of 2.25 out of 5 and said that "Making a film like Rainbow is like entering a danger zone. Stories like these need strong narration and grip on emotions in order to work". Radhika Rajamani of Rediff.com gave the film a rating of two out of five stars. Y. Sunitha Chowdhury of The Hindu opined that "One doesn't understand why the director had to show the hero as being colour blind just to elevate his character and the heroine undergoing a change of heart just because she realises Shyam is suffering from an ailment looks unrealistic".

References

External links